is a Japanese model and beauty pageant titleholder who was crowned Miss Universe Japan 2016 and represented Japan in Miss Universe 2016.

Early life
Nakazawa works as a model in Japan. She likes travelling. She has a very good knowledge about beauty and health.

Pageantry

Miss Shiga 2016
Nakazawa was crowned Miss Shiga 2016 and became eligible to compete at the Miss Universe Japan pageant in 2016.

Miss Universe Japan 2016
Nakazawa was crowned Miss Universe Japan representing Shiga on March 1, 2016. She represented Japan at the Miss Universe 2016 pageant. Sayaka Matsumoto was titled first runner-up, Kaori Arike was titled second runner-up, Mako Sato was adjudged third runner-up, and Yukari Shiotsuki finished as the fourth runner-up.

Miss Universe 2016
Nakazawa competed at Miss Universe 2016 but did not place.

References

External links 
Miss Universe Japan

1993 births
Living people
Japanese beauty pageant winners
Japanese female models
Miss Universe 2016 contestants
People from Ōtsu, Shiga
Models from Shiga Prefecture